The 1986 Japan rugby union tour of Great Britain was a series of matches played in September-October 1986 in Great Britain by the Japan national rugby union team.

Results

References

Note

Japan
tour
Japan national rugby union team tours
tour
tour
Rugby union tours of England
Rugby union tours of Scotland
Japan rugby union tour
Japan rugby union tour